Baraf is a settlement in Ziguinchor Department in Ziguinchor Region in the Basse Casamance area of south-west Senegal. 

In the 2002 census 489 inhabitants in 68 households were recorded.

References

External links
PEPAM

Populated places in the Ziguinchor Department